Tamás Holovits (14 December 1950 – February 2023) was a Hungarian sailor. He competed in the Star event at the 1980 Summer Olympics.

References

External links
 

1950 births
2023 deaths
Hungarian male sailors (sport)
Olympic sailors of Hungary
Sailors at the 1980 Summer Olympics – Star
Sportspeople from Somogy County